Joline Henry (born 29 September 1982 in Whanganui, New Zealand) is a New Zealand former netball player. Henry was a member of the New Zealand national netball team, the Silver Ferns, and has played for the Waikato/Bay of Plenty Magic (2008-2009) and the Northern Mystics (2010-2011) in the ANZ Championship. In 2012, Henry played with the Central Pulse for the 2012 ANZ Championship.

Early life 
Joline Henry was adopted as tamaiti whāngai under tikanga Māori and raised by her grandparents.

Career 
Henry started her professional career in 1999 as a 15-year-old playing for the Western Flyers in the Coca-Cola Cup (later the National Bank Cup). She moved to the Waikato Bay of Plenty Magic after two years, winning two National Bank Cup titles in 2005 and 2006.

Henry was selected for the Silver Ferns in 2003, and made her on-court debut the following year against Australia. She missed out on the team for the 2006 Commonwealth Games in Melbourne, but was selected for the 2007 Netball World Championships in Auckland, where New Zealand finished runners-up. She was also included in the Silver Ferns side that won the inaugural World Netball Series in 2009 and the 2010 Commonwealth Games in Delhi.

With the start of the ANZ Championship in 2008, Henry remained with the Waikato Bay of Plenty Magic. But in 2009, after eight years with the Magic franchise, Henry announced through her agent that she was moving to the Auckland-based Northern Mystics, following a contract dispute. She was joined by fellow Silver Ferns and former Magic teammate Maria Tutaia for the 2010 season. Henry later on moved to the Central Pulse. She retired from international sport in 2014, and in 2016 took up a position at the Harrow International School in Hong Kong.

References

External links 
2011 Silver Ferns profile
2011 Northern Mystics profile
2011 ANZ Championship profile

New Zealand netball players
Northern Mystics players
Waikato Bay of Plenty Magic players
ANZ Championship players
New Zealand international netball players
Commonwealth Games gold medallists for New Zealand
Netball players at the 2010 Commonwealth Games
New Zealand Māori netball players
Sportspeople from Whanganui
1982 births
Living people
Netball players at the 2014 Commonwealth Games
Commonwealth Games silver medallists for New Zealand
Commonwealth Games medallists in netball
Mavericks netball players
New Zealand expatriate netball people in England
2007 World Netball Championships players
2011 World Netball Championships players
Central Pulse players
New Zealand international Fast5 players
National Bank Cup players
Medallists at the 2010 Commonwealth Games
Medallists at the 2014 Commonwealth Games